Hemingway: On the Edge is a one-man show about the life of Ernest Hemingway performed since 1987 by Ed Metzger, and is written by Metzger and his wife Laya Gelff-Metzger.

References

External links
Hemingway: On the Edge one-man play 

Plays by Ed Metzger
Works about Ernest Hemingway
Cultural depictions of Ernest Hemingway
1987 plays